The Lifan Xingshun (兴顺) is a five- to eight-seater Microvan made by Lifan Group, the Chinese automaker.

Overview 

The Xingshun was introduced in 2011 with prices ranging from 37,800 yuan to 45,800 yuan.  The Xingshun is powered by Lifan engines including a 1.0-litre engine and a 1.3-litre engine.

Lifan DC truck

A pickup variant of the Lifan Xingshun called the DC was also available as a double cab pickup, with the body before the B-pillars shared with the microvan.

References

Microvans
Cars introduced in 2011
2010s cars
Xingshun
Cars of China